The 1992 Florida State Seminoles baseball team represented Florida State University in the 1992 NCAA Division I baseball season. The Seminoles played their home games at Dick Howser Stadium, and completed their first season in the Atlantic Coast Conference. The team was coached by Mike Martin in his thirteenth season as head coach at Florida State.

The Seminoles reached the College World Series, their twelfth appearance in Omaha, where they finished tied for fifth place after recording a win against  and a pair of losses to eventual runner-up Cal State Fullerton.

Personnel

Roster

Coaches

Schedule and results

References

Florida State Seminoles baseball seasons
Florida State Seminoles
College World Series seasons
Florida State Seminoles baseball
Florida State